Kimmo Kuhta (born June 19, 1975) is a Finnish former professional ice hockey forward.

Apart from spending the 2005–06 season in the Swiss league, Kuhta represented HIFK in the SM-liiga from 1998 to the end of his career in 2013. He played a total of 728 games in HIFK, second only to Pertti Lehtonen with 851 on the team, and also holds the record for most goals in HIFK with 248 in total. For his long and successful career on the team, he is considered an iconic HIFK player and a favorite among fans. In October 2018, HIFK retired the number 9 in his honor before a match against Tappara.

After his playing career, he has worked as a hockey expert and a commentator for Yle, and coached junior teams for HIFK.

Awards
 Raimo Kilpiö trophy for gentleman player - 2004

Career statistics

References

External links
  (in Finnish)

1975 births
SC Bern players
Finnish ice hockey right wingers
Espoo Blues players
Hamburg Freezers players
HIFK (ice hockey) players
Living people
Ice hockey people from Helsinki